Archetypomys is an extinct genus of early Eocene rodent and the only member of the family Archetypomyidae. A single species, Archetypomys erlianensis, has been described from Inner Mongolia. Archetypomys was a very small rodent intermediate in morphology between the basal rodent family Alagomyidae and more advanced rodents (Meng et al., 2007).

References 
Meng, J., C. Li, X. Ni, Y. Wang, and K.C. Beard. 2007. A new Eocene rodent from the lower Arshanto Formation in the Nuhetingboerhe (Camp Margetts) area, Inner Mongolia. American Museum Novitates, 3569:1-18. 

Eocene rodents
Eocene mammals of Asia
Prehistoric rodent genera